Haid al-Jazil is one of the villages in Daw'an District in Hadhramaut Governorate, which has a population of 17 according to the 2004 census. The mud-brick buildings of the village are built on a huge boulder overlooking the Wadi Dawan valley.

References

External links
Towns and villages in the Hadhramaut Governorate

Populated places in Hadhramaut Governorate